Direct AXEcess is an album by American jazz guitarist Steve Masakowski featuring performances recorded in 1994 for the Blue Note Records label.

Reception
Direct AXEcess received a positive review in Downbeat magazine.

Track listing
All compositions by Steve Masakowski  except as indicated
 "Paladia" – 3:40
 "Burgundy" – 5:24
 "(Voluntary) Simplicity" – 5:31
 "Monk's Mood" (Thelonious Monk) – 2:20
 "Kayak" (Kenny Wheeler) – 8:00
 "Headed Wes’" – 6:21
 "Emily" (Johnny Mandel) – 2:57
 "Ascending Reverence" – 5:48
 "Lush Life" (Billy Strayhorn) – 5:01
 "For Django" (Joe Pass) – 4:07
 "Bayou St. John" – 5:08
 "The Visit" (Pat Martino) – 4:25
 "New Orleans" (Hoagy Carmichael) – 2:24
 Recorded at The Boiler Room, New Orleans, September 1994

Personnel
Steve Masakowski – Seven-string guitar
Hank Mackie – guitar
David Torkanowsky – piano
Bill Huntington – acoustic bass
James Singleton – acoustic bass
Brian Blade – drums

References

Blue Note Records albums
Steve Masakowski albums
1995 albums